The 1970 Pacific hurricane season began on May 15, 1970 in the east Pacific, and on June 1, 1970 in the central Pacific. It ended on November 30, 1970. These dates conventionally delimit the period of time when tropical cyclones form in the eastern Pacific Ocean.

This season had an above average number of storms. There were twenty-one tropical cyclones, of which eighteen reached tropical storm strength. Four storms became hurricanes, of which none reached major hurricane strength. In the central Pacific, one hurricane and one tropical depression formed. One of the depressions crossed the dateline to become a typhoon.



Systems

Hurricane Adele 

An area of low pressure lacked strong convection until May 30, when it strengthened into Tropical Depression One-E. On May 31, the storm further intensified into Tropical Storm Adele, the first named storm and Hurricane of the season. Adele tracked westward, as it strengthened into a hurricane on June 1. It reached its peak intensity later that day. As Adele moved west, A hostile environment caused it to weaken into a Tropical Storm. Adele further weakened, and it was downgraded into a depression on June 7. It was degenerated into an open trough, and it dissipated on June 7. 

Despite that it remained away from any land masses, Adele was retired after this season for unknown reasons.

Tropical Storm Blanca 

The tropical disturbance that became Blanca was first noted on June 8 from satellite pictures. The new disturbance would reach tropical storm strength 24 hours later. Blanca moved in a northwest direction throughout its short life, dissipating on June 12.

Tropical Storm Connie 

Near the same location where Hurricane Adele formed two weeks earlier, a disturbance was noted on June 13. The disturbance abruptly became a tropical storm on June 17. Connie started weakening on June 19, finally dissipating on June 21 after stalling  from Clarion Island.

Tropical Depression Dolores 

A disturbance first noted on June 19 had efficient outflow to be called a tropical depression. Satellite photos taken the same day revealed cloud structure that resembled a tropical storm forming, resulting in the system being called Dolores. The day after, no traces of a storm or of "Dolores" were found by reconnaissance. Post season analysis revealed Dolores to have only been a tropical depression.

Tropical Storm Eileen 

A tropical depression formed just off the southern coast of Mexico on June 26. It headed northwestward, reaching storm strength on June 28. The next day, Eileen turned to the northeast, reached a peak of  winds, and hit western Mexico.

Hurricane Francesca 

Francesca was a Category 2 hurricane which was, for a period of time, obscured by a cap of clouds above the hurricane's eye, distorting the appearance of the hurricane. The precursor disturbance to Hurricane Francesca was first noticed on July 1. The system became a tropical depression later that day and reached tropical storm strength the next day. On July 3, data from a ship indicated winds of near , which indicate a storm of Category 2 strength, near the center of Francesca. The cloud cap, which remained over the hurricane since it first became a hurricane, started to move off the lower clouds around the center of the system around July 5. A center fix was obtained, but the maximum sustained winds were unobtainable from the sea surface because of cloud cover in and around the center. Francesca started weakening on July 6, a fact made clear by reconnaissance which indicated that the system had weakened to a tropical storm. The further weakening was obscured by the cloud cover. The final reconnaissance on the weakening system was reported on July 8, two days before Francesca dissipated.

Tropical Storm Gretchen 

Gretchen was first noticed on satellite imagery on July 14. From then on out, Gretchen was a hard storm to predict, leading to large errors in forecasting. The storm dissipated on July 21.

Tropical Storm Helga 

The system that became Helga was first noticed on July 16. The next day, reconnaissance found a minimal tropical storm with winds of only . Based on satellite imagery, Helga was believed to be gaining strength as it approached Baja California. At one point during intensification, the storm abruptly started weakening, and on July 19, after stalling less than 118 miles (190 km) south of the tip of Baja California, Helga dissipated.

Tropical Storm Ione 1 

A tropical depression developed off the southern coast of Mexico on July 22. A larger, more active, and intensifying tropical cyclone was spotted by satellite at 2235 on the 24th near 17°N., 111°W. When the expanding circulation of this
storm center reached the area of lone No. 1, winds in the latter area decreased and lone No. 1 disappeared abruptly. The second storm, also called lone, moved
north-northwestward and began to weaken. Her top winds were apparently reached about the time of the picture on the 24th which indicated speeds of 55 or 60
kn. Maximum winds on the 25th were 45 kn. near 20. N.,112°W. These winds decreased to 25 kn. the next day as storm activity faded rapidly near 16 N., 113°W'.
What was unusual about the system was that another tropical storm developed just to its northeast on July 24. That storm, also named Ione, tracked northward, reaching a peak of  winds before dissipating on July 25. Operationally, these were considered to be the same storm.

Tropical Storm Ione 2 

A tropical depression was discovered near 14°N.,102°W., at 1800 on July 22, but it became disorganized as seen on satellite pictures the next day. Later
events indicate it was splitting into two tropical cyclones, both of which were to attain tropical storm strength. The tropical storm first called lone
was encountered by the KANIKAWA MARU at 2100 on July 24. That ship was buffeted by 48-kn southeasterly winds and 15-ft seas near 21°N, 107°W. The storm washed
out the next day.

Tropical Storm Joyce 

A broad, flat low-pressure area persisted south of Baja California after Ione dissipated. On July 29, a small low circulation developed with a center about 120 nautical miles (220 km) south of Manzanillo. In a similar way to Hurricane Francesca, Tropical Storm Joyce's low level center was unclear due to a cap of cirrus clouds. Joyce reached its peak intensity on July 31 with winds of near  before weakening, becoming a depression on August 1. Joyce dissipated on August 4.

Tropical Storm Kristen 

Kristen was a loosely organized storm that formed from a disturbance that was causing squalls near the Mexican coast. Tropical storm-force winds were found on August 5. Kristen was tracked by ship reports and satellite pictures. Kristen reached its peak intensity of  winds on August 6. The storm dissipated on August 8 while over cold water.

Hurricane Lorraine 

Tropical Storm Lorraine, which formed on August 16 south of Mexico, intensified to a hurricane on the 20th. Two days later over open waters, it reached a peak of 95 mph (153 km/h) winds, but estimates from the Central Pacific Hurricane Center estimated it had winds of 115 mph (185 km/h). Without a chance to strengthen further, Lorraine weakened, finally dissipating on August 27 due to dry air.

Tropical Storm Maggie 

A flat low-pressure system appeared in an area of showers to the west-southwest of hurricane Lorraine around 1800 on the 20th. The French refrigerated
cargo carrier BIAFRA was buffeted by 38-kn southerly winds, with a barometer reading 1006 mbar, near 13'N, 132'W, by the soon to be named tropical storm Maggie at 0000 on the 21st. Maggie intensified slowly while moving west-northwestward at 9 kn; her maximum winds were estimated at 55 kn at 0300 on the 25th. Maggie passed about 80 mi south of the island of Hawaii on the 25th, dumping torrential rains over the big island. Rainfall amounts ranged from 10 to 15 in on the windward side of the island from the Hamuka coast
to Puna and from 1 to 7 in on the leeward side. Maggie was downgraded to a tropical depression at 0900 on the 26th near 18N, 157W.
A westward turn saved Hawaii from a direct hit, but Maggie still brought strong surf and heavy yet beneficial rain to the island of Hawaii. There is some evidence that the remains of Maggie redeveloped into Hurricane Dot in the Central Pacific on September 1.

Tropical Storm Norma 

Norma was an indirect but essential cause of a flood disaster in Arizona that became known as the "Labor Day Storm of 1970". A depression formed August 31 and rapidly intensified into a tropical storm. Moving rapidly, it headed out to sea before slowing down and weakening. Norma's circulation fed humid unstable air into a large extratropical cyclone over Arizona. As Norma dissipated, record rains fell over the state from September 4 to September 6.

The rains were deadly. There were a total of 22 deaths, including 14 from a flash flood on a creek. The damage amounted to over 1 million dollars.

Hurricane Dot 

A tropical disturbance, possibly the remnants of Tropical Storm Maggie, became a tropical depression on September 1 to the northwest of Hawaii. It moved to the northwest, coming within miles of the International Date Line and Midway Island but remaining in the Central Pacific. Dot turned to the northeast, reaching tropical storm strength on September 2 and hurricane strength September 3 before being absorbed by a cold core system the next day. When Dot became a hurricane at 35° north, it became the highest latitude for a storm to reach hurricane strength east of the International Dateline. This record was soon eclipsed by Hurricane 12 of the 1975 season. A flight flown into Dot also flew into Typhoon Clara.

Tropical Storm Orlene 

 Tropical Storm Orlene hit Mexico in eastern Oaxaca on September 8, having maintained a northeast track for its short lifetime.

Hurricane Patricia 

Hurricane Patricia was a strong Category 2 hurricane with winds of 95 mph, Patricia formed on October 4 and dissipated on October 11.

Tropical Storm Rosalie 

Rosalie's existence was confirmed on October 21 by observation from a ship. Reconnaissance on the 22nd reported a central pressure of 1006 mb. After a slight regeneration on the 23rd, Rosalie began rapid dissipation, finally dissipating on the 23rd.

Tropical Storm Selma 

The final storm of the season, Tropical Storm Selma, developed on November 1 to the southwest of Mexico. It meandered to the north, turning to the northeast and northwest before heading southeastward and dissipating on November 8.

Storm names 
These names were used for storms that formed in the east Pacific Ocean this season. It is the same list used in the 1966 season. Names not retired from this list were used again in the 1974 season. Storms were named Norma, Orlene, Patricia, Rosalie, and Selma for the first time this season. Names not used this year are marked in gray.

One storm, Ione, was treated as one storm operationally but was found to have been two storms in post-analysis. Another storm, Dolores, was found to have been a tropical depression in post-season analysis and shouldn't have been named.

The central Pacific used names and numbers from the west Pacific's typhoon list. One name— Dot— was required.

The name Adele was retired from this list for unknown reasons. It was replaced in the 1974 season with Aletta.

This is the only time that the name Kristen was used. In the 1966 season the name Kirsten was used. It was changed to Kristen this year, perhaps due to a clerical error. In the 1974 season, it reverted to Kirsten.

Administrative changes 
This is the first season that the Redwood City-based Eastern Pacific Hurricane Center started issuing advisories on tropical cyclones in the eastern north Pacific. It replaced the previous forecaster, Fleet Weather Central.

The Central Pacific Hurricane Center started to issue advisories on tropical cyclones in its area of responsibility this season. It replaced the Joint Hurricane Warning Center.

See also 

 List of Pacific hurricanes
 Pacific hurricane season
 1970 Atlantic hurricane season
 1970 Pacific typhoon season
 1970 North Indian Ocean cyclone season
 Australian cyclone seasons: 1969–70, 1970–71
 South Pacific cyclone seasons: 1969–70, 1970–71
 South-West Indian Ocean cyclone seasons: 1969–70, 1970–71

References 

 1970 CPHC Archive accessed November 17, 2005
 NOAA Monthly Weather Review accessed November 17, 2005
 Arizona's tropical cyclones accessed November 17, 2005

External links 
 Eastern Pacific Hurricane Season of 1970
 CPHC Season Summary
 ATCR Eastern Pacific summary

 
Pacific hurricane seasons
Articles which contain graphical timelines